This is the list of operas performed at the Teatro San Cassiano in Venice.


References

Bibliography 
 Irene Alm, Catalog of Venetian Librettos at the University of California, Los Angeles, Berkeley – Los Angeles – Oxford, University of California Press, 1993
 Giovanni Carlo Bonlini, Le glorie della poesia e della musica [...], Venice, C. Buonarrigo, 1730
 Antonio Groppo, Catalogo di tutti i drammi per musica recitati ne’ teatri di Venezia [...], Venice, A. Groppo, 1745
 Claudio Sartori, I libretti italiani a stampa dalle origini al 1800. Catalogo analitico con 16 indici, 7 vols, Cuneo, Bertola & Locatelli, 1990–94
 Eleanor Selfridge-Field, A New Chronology of Venetian Opera and Related Genres, 1660–1760, Stanford, Stanford University Press, 2007
 Oscar George Theodore Sonneck, Catalogue of Opera Librettos Printed Before 1800, 2 vols, Washington, Government Printing Office, 1914
 John Whenham, Perspectives on the Chronology of the First Decade of Public Opera at Venice, “Il Saggiatore musicale”, Vol. 11 n.2, Florence, Olschki, 2004, pp. 253–302
 , I teatri musicali veneziani del Settecento, Venice, Visentini, 1897

External links 
 Museo internazionale e biblioteca della musica di Bologna
 Repertorio e archivio di libretti del melodramma italiano dal 1600 al 1900
 Internet Culturale

Performance art by location
San Cassiano
Theatres in Venice
Opera-related lists
Opera in Venice